Janata Television is a TV channel of Nepal which was launched on 2017. The headquarters of the channel is situated in Kathmandu, Nepal. Janata Network is the owner of the channel.

References

Television channels in Nepal
Television channels and stations established in 2017
2017 establishments in Nepal